Filip was an eleventh-century bishop of Płock, Poland.

According to Jan Długosz he was from the Doliwczyków Polish Noble family and was appointed by Pope Paschal II. He is known to history through some papal correspondence, but exact dates for his bishopric are uncertain. He was probably ordained 1099 or 1100 and remained Bishop unto 1007AD or 1112AD.

References

Bishops of Płock
Year of birth unknown
11th-century births
12th-century deaths
11th-century Roman Catholic bishops in Poland
12th-century Roman Catholic bishops in Poland